Vernon School may refer to:

Vernon School (Verona, California), listed on the National Register of Historic Places (NRHP)
Vernon School (Vernon, Iowa)
Vernon District Schoolhouse No. 4, Vernon, Vermont, NRHP-listed
Vernon County Normal School, Viroqua, Wisconsin, listed on the National Register of Historic Places
 Vernon School (formerly Vernon Elementary School) - Portland, Oregon - Portland Public Schools

See also
 Vernon Elementary School (disambiguation)